Kolenté  is a town and sub-prefecture in the Kindia Prefecture in the Kindia Region of western Guinea.

It lies about 20 km from the Sierra Leone border.

Transport 

It is served by a small station on the national railway system.

See also 

 Railway stations in Guinea

References

Sub-prefectures of the Kindia Region